The Igreja de Nossa Senhora das Neves  (Church of Our Lady of the Snows) is a historical Catholic church in Rachol village, Salcete sub-district, on the southern banks of the Zuari river, in the South Goa district of Goa state, India. The church was built in the 1560's during the Goa Inquisition. It is situated in close proximity to the renowned Rachol Seminary. There is a church of the same name in the neighbouring village of Raia.

History

The Colonial Portuguese Baroque style church was originally built with mud walls and a thatched roof, alongside the fort of Rachol. The Captain of the Rachol fortress (in Portuguese Capitão desta Fortaleza de Rachol) Diogo Rodrigues was appointed to carry out the work. It was completed in AD 1565 by destroying the temples at that site, including that of Kamakshi. Idol of Kamakshi, referred to as Āī (mother in Konkani), was moved to neighbouring village of Shiroda, across the Zuari river. 

The church was dedicated to Nossa Senhora das Neves (Our Lady of the Snows).  It has been referred to as the "Mother church" (Matriz) for the whole of southern Goa and was named Igreja de Nossa Senhora das Neves. It was the Seat of the first Archbishop of Goa, Dom Gaspar Jorge de Leão Pereira who personally visited Margão and the surrounding areas to choose the location. Dom shot an arrow into the ground at Rachol and ordered the church to be built there. The church was considered to be the first in the Salcette concelho (Salcette was called Ilha de Salcette do Sul at that time).

Two historical burials took place at the altar. The first burial was for the captain of the Fort (Capitão desta Fortaleza) Diogo Rodrigues in AD 1577. The second regards the massacre of Jesuit priests and civilians that occurred in the Cuncolim Revolt in July 1583. The martyrs' bodies remained in the church until AD 1597, after which they were moved to Saint Paul's College, Goa and laid to rest in Old Goa at the Cathedral in AD 1862.

See also
 
 
 List of Jesuit sites

References

Colonial Goa
Roman Catholic churches in Goa
Roman Catholic churches completed in 1565
16th-century Roman Catholic church buildings in India
1565 establishments in India
1560s establishments in Portuguese India
Baroque church buildings in India
Portuguese colonial architecture in India
1565 establishments in the Portuguese Empire
Churches in South Goa district